The 31st annual National Geographic Bee was held in Washington, D.C. and hosted by Mo Rocca. It is sponsored by the National Geographic Society.  The State Bees were held on March 29, where the 54 finalists were determined.  The 2019 Champion, Nihar Janga, received a $25,000 college scholarship, a lifetime membership to the National Geographic Society, and an all-expenses-paid Lindblad Expedition for two to the Galápagos Islands.
This was to be the last GeoBee, as National Geographic made the decision to end the competition, after canceling the 2020 and 2021 National Geographic Bees due to the COVID-19 pandemic.

State Bees
On March 29, 2019, the National Geographic State Bees were held across the 50 states, Washington, D.C., the Atlantic Territories, the Pacific Territories, and the Department of Defense.  Fifty-four State or Territory level Champions were determined. In 2019, the prize for winning the state bee has been raised, as $1,000 is now given to the winner instead of $200, the old prize.  The winners have also received a National Geographic 2019 Almanac. Second and third place winners received $300 and $100, respectively. The state preliminary rounds (there were 8 total) consisted of rounds about U.S. geography, physical geography, UNESCO World Heritage Sites, Weird but True, current events, Odd one out, US City-World City Comparison, and plastic. All 54 regional champions received an all-expenses-paid trip to Washington, D.C. to compete at the national competition from May 19–22.

The state competitions' prize money was increased again from last year. First place got $1000, second place got $300, and third place stayed at $100. The national competitions' college scholarships have decreased, however. The national champion will only receive a $25,000 scholarship, second place will receive a $10,000 scholarship, and third place will receive a $5,000 scholarship.

Preliminary rounds

The 54 state champions competed in the preliminary rounds held from May 19–20, 2019. This part of the contest consisted of 10 oral rounds, as well as a written portion about tackling plastic pollution in various waterways around the world.  Both sections were worth 10 points.

The top 10 contestants with the highest scores in the preliminary rounds competed in the semifinals on May 21.  After 7 other contestants were eliminated that day, Rishi Kumar of Maryland, Atreya Mallanna from Massachusetts, and Nihar Janga from Texas advanced to the finals, which were held the next day.  

In addition, Matthew McDonald of New Jersey and Satvik Pochiraju of Ohio also finished with 15.7 out of 20 points, but were eliminated by a tiebreaker test the students had taken specifically for the purpose of breaking ties.

Semi-final and Final Rounds

The semi-final competition was held on May 21, 2019.  After seven rounds with a mix of individual and common questions, with each question being worth one point, and one lighting round, with three rapid-fire questions being asked, each being worth one point, the four students with the lowest scores were eliminated.  Aarush Tutiki of Michigan and Kaylan Patel of Florida were both eliminated and tied for 9th place, along with Omkar Gadewar of Illinois, who finished in 8th place.  However, there was a tie that existed between Jishnu Nayak of California, Lakshay Sood of New Mexico, and Dylan Rem of New York, with only two of them being able to advance to the next round.  After applying the results of a tiebreaker test that the students took previously, Dylan Rem of New York was eliminated and finished in 7th place.  After that, a GeoChallenge Impact round took place.  The remaining six contestants were given two photos of the same place, one of the pictures was taken in the past, and one was taken in the last couple of years.  Contestants were asked to describe the changes that took place and why they mattered.  After this, the three students with the lowest scores were eliminated.  Lakshay Sood of New Mexico was eliminated and finished in 6th place, along with Vaibhav Hariram of North Carolina, who finished in 5th place, and Jishnu Nayak of California, who finished in 4th place.  After this, Rishi Kumar of Maryland, Atreya Mallanna of Massachusetts, and Nihar Janga of Texas remained and competed in the final rounds the next day.

The Final Rounds were held the next day on May 22, 2019.   The three contestants began with a series of five common questions, with each correct answer being awarded one point.  After this,  it was revealed that the top three contestants were interviewed by the judges for an Impact Challenge round.  The videos of these interviews were then displayed.  The contestants were first asked why it is important to protect wild places on earth.  Afterwards, the contestants were given five choices of places that they believed National Geographic should protect.  The choices were Amur(Heilong) River Basin in China, the Carpathian Mountains in Romania, the Congo Basin Tropical Forest in the Republic of the Congo, the Kazakh Steppe in Kazakhstan, and the Murray-Darling River Basin in Australia.  All three contestants chose the Congo Basin Tropical Forest.  Then, Finalists were asked to explain one step they could take to help protect their chosen location.  After this, a Mapmaker round was held.  Contestants were asked to draw on a map of the Arctic Region.  They were first asked to circle one city on the map that would experience significant economic and population changes, and were then asked to explain why they chose that city.  They were then asked to choose two cities that lied beyond the map that would benefit from a new shipping route through the Arctic, and were asked to explain their reasoning.  Lastly, they were asked to highlight an area on the map that they believed would need protection as a result of human activity, and were asked to explain their reasoning.  After this round, Rishi Kumar of Maryland had the lowest score and was eliminated, finishing in 3rd place.  The championship round between Atreya Mallanna of Massachusetts and Nihar Janga of Texas followed.  After a series of eight questions, Nihar Janga of Texas correctly answered the question "One-third of Norway’s northernmost county is in what plateau?", putting "Finnmark Plateau" as his answer, becoming the 2019 National Geographic Bee Champion.

References 

National Geographic Bee
National Geographic Bee
National Geographic Bee
National Geographic Bee